Duferco Participations Holding SA, is a company based in Luxembourg City, Luxembourg. Its main business is trading, producing, importing and exporting steel.

History 
Duferco was founded in 1979 by Italian Bruno Bolfo. His goal was to learn from Brazil from worldwide steel export. In 1982, the company moved its headquarters from New York and São Paulo to Lugano. Initially active only in the steel trade, Duferco also expanded its activities to the commodities trade in the early 1990s, in particular with raw materials for the steel industry such as coke, coal, iron ore, pig iron or sponge iron.

With the acquisition in 1996 of the Italian  Ferdofin Siderurgica  (later renamed  Duferdofin) Duferco rose in the steel production. Later, the company acquired additional steel mills, especially in Italy, Belgium and Eastern Europe.

After the turn of the millennium, Duferco split its activities with, among other things, its entry into the energy, shipping and logistics sectors.

Business
The activities of the Duferco Participations Holding SA are divided into areas of trading, production and sales and producing energy and services.

Trading activities include all types of steel and steel products as well as raw materials for the steel industry. In 2007, the trade volume was 17.5 million tons, of which just under two thirds were steel and steel products and around one third raw materials. Duferco has 20 own steel works. In 2007, these produced a total of 6.9 million tonnes of steel. Sales includes the sale of processed steel products.

The group is also increasingly active in selected sectors of the energy sector, in particular renewable energies, shipping companies and logistics.

Subsidiaries Companies and High Debt Level Issue
Duferco Participations Holding SA can count on a large number of subsidiary companies, including: Duferco Italia Holding Spa, Duferco Travi e Profilati S.p.A., Duferco Commerciale Spa, Duferco Energia Spa, Duferco Bulgaria, Duferco Wallonie S.A., Duferco France S.N.C., Duferco Participations Holding S.A., Virtual Duferco Group, Ironet Ltd Romania, Duferco S.A. (Switzerland company), Duferco Kiev Representative Office, Ipacer S.A. and many more.

Duferco Italia Holding company had a negative net income of 13 millions euro on 2015 and it has a total debt amount of 234 € millions.

References

External links
 

Steel companies of Luxembourg
Companies established in 1979